Jerry Ball Jr. (born December 15, 1964) is a former professional American football defensive lineman in the National Football League (NFL) who played primarily as a nose tackle. He played professionally for the Detroit Lions, the Cleveland Browns, the Los Angeles / Oakland Raiders, and the Minnesota Vikings.

Biography
Ball was born in Beaumont, Texas, and attended Hebert High School, then after integration graduated from West Brook High School, where he played fullback and rushed for 1,000 yards and LB for 1982 5A State Championship All State honors. He was All District in three positions and was selected to play in the Texas high school all star game.

He played college football at Southern Methodist University in University Park, Texas. He was a four-year letter-winner and ranks 4th on the all-time sack list at SMU. All-American, All Southwest Conference 84-86. He was a two-time Outland and Lombardi award finalist, and a Christian-Terrell 3-time winner.

Professional career
Ball was drafted by the Detroit Lions in the 3rd round (63rd overall) of the 1987 NFL Draft. During his career he went to three Pro Bowls with the Detroit Lions.

Ball played in the NFL for 13 seasons. He recorded 32.5 sacks during his career, most of them coming as a nose tackle with the Detroit Lions. Despite this fact, Ball spent his entire career being double teamed and often triple teamed by opposing teams. Ball's dominance was such a force that teams would realign their best players to help centers deal with the pressure Ball kept on the middle of the offense. Known mostly as a run stuffer later in his career, he has been considered one of the best nose tackles of this era. Anchoring the Minnesota Viking defense alongside John Randle, also a Pro Bowl defensive tackle, Ball re-emerged as a leader and dominant force on the Vikings 15-1 record setting team.

Personal life
Ball is a member of Omega Psi Phi fraternity at Southern Methodist University. He has three daughters; Faren, Lindsey, and Haley.

References

External links
 Po-Football-Reference.Com
 NFL Enterprises LLC
 Sports Illustrated: Game Ball - When Lion nosetackle Jerry Ball comes to play, somebody has to pay
 PRNewswire: NFL football legend Jerry Ball and Dr. Partha Nandi tackle the effects of multiple concussions in athletes

1964 births
Living people
American football defensive tackles
Detroit Lions players
Cleveland Browns players
Los Angeles Raiders players
Oakland Raiders players
Minnesota Vikings players
National Conference Pro Bowl players
People from Beaumont, Texas
SMU Mustangs football players